Patrick "Pat" Dwyer (31 March 1894 – 9 August 1948) was an Irish boxer. He competed in the men's welterweight event at the 1924 Summer Olympics. He lived most of his life in Thurles and worked as a Garda Síochána (policeman).

References

External links
 

1894 births
1948 deaths
Irish male boxers
Olympic boxers of Ireland
Boxers at the 1924 Summer Olympics
People from Thurles
Welterweight boxers
Garda Síochána officers